The South Eastern line of Kolkata Suburban Railway is a suburban railway line  serving Kolkata, West Bengal, India. It consists of 37 stations from Howrah Junction to Midnapore. The entire line is at grade. It has section of triple track starting from Howrah Junction and ends at Midnapore, Amta, Haldia and Digha stations in West Bengal.

The South Eastern line in Kolkata consists of 3 major corridors, which bifurcate as they run into the suburban satellite towns. Two corridors (one local and other through) follow the South Eastern Railway run from Howrah Junction (HWH) to Midnapore (128 km), at the mainline there, is a bifurcation into two branch lines – one from Panskura to Haldia (69 km) in the south-east and the other from Shalimar to Amta (50 km) in the west. These two corridors constitute the 'main' South Eastern line.

The major car sheds on this line are at Tikiapara, Panskura & Kharagpur. There are fast and slow locals here for suburban service. Trains usually start from and terminate at important stations.

Stations with Routes

Routes
The South Eastern line consists of the following routes:
 Howrah Jn – Midnapore
 Panskura Jn – Haldia
 Shalimar – Amta
 Tamluk – Digha
 Andul - Baltikuri

Stations
Names in bold indicate that the station is a fast train stop as well as important terminal.

Main line

†Howrah Junction railway station is a terminus for South Eastern Railway and Eastern Railway.

Main line Branches
At the main line of South Eastern line, there is a bifurcation in two sections and one line crosses onto it.

West branch line

South East branch line

†Tamluk railway station acts as a Junction station and makes a branch line to Digha.

South branch line

Electrification
SER electrified the South Eastern line to 25,000 V AC in the period of 1967 to 1969 with the different phases: Howrah – Maurigram, Maurigram – Bauria, Bauria – Uluberia, Uluberia – Shyamchak, Shyamchak – Kharagpur. During this period the first EMU train on this line was started on Howrah – Mecheda route after completion of this route it was extended to Kharagpur on 1 February 1969.

In the period 1974 to 1976, Panskura – Haldia line was also electrified with the two phases: Panskura – Durgachak & Durgachak – Haldia, After that EMU services was started on this line at 1 May 1976.

In 1985, The Kharagpur – Midnapore line was also electrified.

Services
Currently, the South Eastern Railway Running 12 Car Services on South Eastern line, Before May 2018 The 9 Car rakes was running due to an increase in passenger transport conversion of 9 Car Rakes into 12 Car rakes was started for ease of transportation.

And also, South Eastern Railway is also Running a GPS based 3-phase Medha ICF EMU train with CCTV cameras in ladies compartment in suburban sections, which was flagged off on 22 March 2018.

See also
 Kolkata Suburban Railway
 List of Kolkata Suburban Railway stations
 South Eastern Railway zone

References

Kolkata Suburban Railway lines
Railway lines opened in 1900
Rail transport in Howrah
Transport in Kharagpur
Transport in Haldia
Transport in Digha
South Eastern Railway zone